Jatusana block is a tehsil in Rewari district, Haryana, India. It consists of 65 Gram Panchayats and 73 villages.

Ruby Rajkumar Yadav
Chairman Block Simiti Jatusana resident of
Qutubpuri Bujurg

Village panchayats
1. Asiaki Gorawas
2. Aulant
3. Babdoli
4. Balawas Jamapur
5. Baldhan Kalan
6. Baldhan Khurd
7. Berli Kalan
8. Berli Khurd
9. Biharipur, Rewari
10. Bohatwas Bhondu
11. Boria Kamalpur
12. Chandanwas
13. (A) Chowki No. 1 (Name of Gram Panchyat); (B) Maliaki
14. Chowki No. 2
15. Dahina
16. Dakhora
17. Daroli, Rewari
18. Dehlawas
19. Didoli
20. Kahari, Rewari
21. Dohkia
22. Fatehpuri Tappa Dahina
23. Gadhla
24. Gopal Pur Gazi
25. Gothra Tappa Dahina
26. Gulabpura, Rewari
27. Gurawra
28. Haluhera
29. (A) Hansawas (Name of Gram Panchyat); (B) Prithvipura
30. Jatusana
31. Jeewra
32. Kanhora
33. Kanhori
34. Kanwali
35. Karawra Manakpur
36. Khera Alampur
37. Khushpura
38. Kumbrodha
39. Lala, Rewari
40. Lisan
41. Mandhia Khurd
42. Maseet
43. Mastapur
44. Mohdinpur
45. Motla Kalan
46. Motla Khurd
47. Murlipur
48. Musepur
49. (A) Nain Sukhpura (Name of Gram Panchyat); (B) Mundanwas; (C) Jaruwas
50. Nangal Mundi
51. Nangal Pathani
52. Nanglia Ranmokh
53. (A) Pahrajwas (name of Gram Panchyat); (B) Saidpur, Rewari; (C) Chag, Rewari
54. (A) Palhawas; (B) Chang, Rewari
55. Parkhotampur
56. Qutubpuri Bujurg
57. Rampuri, Rewari
58. Rasuli
59. Rohrai
60. Rojhuwas
61. (A) Shadipur, Rewari (Name of Gram Panchyat); (B) Rajawas; (C) Nurpur, Rewari
62. Sihas
63. Suma Khera
64. Tehana Depalpur

See also
Jatusana
 Rewari

References

Rewari district